The 2012 CBA Playoffs is the postseason for the Chinese Basketball Association's 2011–12 season. The playoffs started on February 22, 2012 and ended on March 30, 2012. Beijing Ducks defeated Guangdong Southern Tigers to win their first CBA championship. It was broadcast on CCTV-5 and many local channels in China. Eight teams qualified for the playoffs, all seeded 1 to 8 in a tournament bracket, with first and second round in a best-of-five format, and a final in a best-of-seven format.

Playoff qualifying

 Note +: February 15 was the last matchday of regular season.

Bracket
Teams in bold advanced to the next round. The numbers to the left of each team indicate the team's seeding in regular season, and the numbers to the right indicate the number of games the team won in that round. Home court advantage belongs to the team with the better regular season record; teams enjoying the home advantage are shown in italics.

Match details
All times are in China standard time (UTC+8)

Quarterfinals

(1) Guangdong Southern Tigers vs. (8) Fujian Xunxing

Regular-season series
Teams were tied 1–1 in the regular-season series:

This was the first time Guangdong and Fujian had met in the CBA Playoffs.

(2) Beijing Ducks vs. (7) Zhejiang Lions

Regular-season series
Zhejiang Lions won 2–0 in the regular-season series:

This was the first time Beijing and the Zhejiang Lions had met in the CBA Playoffs.

(3) Shanxi Brave Dragons vs. (6) Shanghai Sharks

Regular-season series
Teams were tied 1–1 in the regular-season series:

This was the first time Shanxi and Shanghai had met in the CBA Playoffs.

(4) Xinjiang Flying Tigers vs. (5) Dongguan Leopards

Regular-season series
Teams were tied 1–1 in the regular-season series:

This was the first time Xinjiang and Dongguan had met in the CBA Playoffs.

Semifinals

(1) Guangdong Southern Tigers vs. (4) Xinjiang Flying Tigers

Regular-season series
Guangdong won 2–0 in the regular-season series:

Last Playoffs meeting: 2011 CBA Finals (Guangdong won 4–2).

(2) Beijing Ducks vs. (3) Shanxi Brave Dragons

Regular-season series
Teams were tied 1–1 in the regular-season series:

This was the first time Beijing and Shanxi had met in the CBA Playoffs.

CBA Finals: (1) Guangdong Southern Tigers vs. (2) Beijing Ducks

Regular-season series
Teams were tied 1–1 in the regular-season series:

Last Playoffs meeting: 2003 CBA Semifinals (Guangdong won 3–0).

References

External links
Official Website 
163 CBA Coverage

Chinese Basketball Association playoffs
playoffs